Pedicularis racemosa is a species of flowering plant in the family Orobanchaceae known by the common names sickletop lousewort and leafy lousewort. It is native to western North America, where it grows in coniferous forests. The inflorescence is a small raceme of flowers occupying the top of the stem. The fruit is a capsule over a centimeter in length containing smooth seeds.

External links
Jepson Manual Treatment
USDA Plants Profile
Photo gallery

racemosa
Flora of the Northwestern United States
Flora of California
Flora of Arizona
Flora of British Columbia
Flora of New Mexico
Flora of the Klamath Mountains
Flora of the Rocky Mountains
Flora of the Sierra Nevada (United States)
Taxa named by George Bentham
Taxa named by William Jackson Hooker
Flora without expected TNC conservation status